Tach Armachiho is one of the woredas in the Amhara Region of Ethiopia. This woreda is named after "Armachiho", a province in northwestern Ethiopia along the border with Sudan and south of the Tekezé River. Part of the Semien Gondar Zone, Tach Armachiho is bordered on the south by Lay Armachiho and Chilga, on the southwest by Metemma, on the west by Mirab Armachiho, on the north by the Tegeda, on the east by Dabat,  and on the southeast by Wegera. Tach Armachiho was part of former Sanja woreda.

Demographics
Based on the 2007 national census conducted by the Central Statistical Agency of Ethiopia (CSA), this woreda has a total population of 89,115, of whom 45,874 are men and 43,241 women; 12,258 or 13.8% are urban inhabitants. The majority of the inhabitants practiced Ethiopian Orthodox Christianity, with 97.8% reporting that as their religion, while 1.4% of the population said they were Muslim.

Notes

Districts of Amhara Region